2016 European Artistic Gymnastics Championships may refer to:

2016 European Women's Artistic Gymnastics Championships
2016 European Men's Artistic Gymnastics Championships

European Artistic Gymnastics Championships